Raoui (راوي "storyteller") is the first album of Souad Massi, the Algerian-born, Paris-based singer-songwriter, released by Wrasse Records in 2001. It was given a three-star rating by AllMusic reviewer Chris Nickson, who concluded: "there's plenty of promise for the future, as long as she really remembers her roots and doesn't wander the empty halls of rock." The Arabic lyrics and translations are published.

Track listing 

 "Raoui" - 3:47
 "Bladi" - 3:41
 "Amessa" - 3:47
 "Tant Pis Pour Moi" - 3:07
 "Hayati" - 4:10
 "Nekreh El Kelb" - 4:36
 "Denya" - 3:23
 "Khsara Aalik" - 4:45
 "Rani Rayha" - 4:49
 "J'ai pas de temps" - 4:06
 "Awham" - 4:25
 "Lamen" - 4:51
 "Enta Dari" - 3:46
 "Matebkiche" - 3:29

References

Souad Massi albums
2001 debut albums